Orgulho e Paixão (in English: Pride and Passion) is a Brazilian telenovela produced and broadcast by TV Globo. It premiered on 20 March 2018, replacing Tempo de Amar, and concluded on 24 September 2018, being replaced by Espelho da Vida. Created by Marcos Bernstein, the plot is inspired by the novels: Sense and Sensibility (1811), Pride and Prejudice (1813), Emma (1815) Northanger Abbey (1818) and Lady Susan (1871), all by Jane Austen.

Plot
Set in 1910, the plot takes place in the fictional Valley of Café and tells the story of Elisabeta (Nathalia Dill), woman ahead of her time, with dreams and ambitions completely different for a young woman for the period. She is encouraged by her father Felisberto (Tato Gabus Mendes) to realize her dreams. Elisabeta lives with four other sisters, each with a different personality. She will have a turnaround in her life when she meets Darcy (Thiago Lacerda), with whom they will share a great passion.

Cast

 Nathalia Dill as Elisabeta Benedito
 Thiago Lacerda as Darcy Williamson
 Alessandra Negrini as Suzana Vernon
 Vera Holtz as Ofélia Benedito
 Pâmela Tomé as Jane Benedito
 Chandelly Braz as Mariana Benedito
 Ana Júlia Dorigon as Cecília Benedito
 Bruna Griphao as Lídia Benedito
 Tato Gabus Mendes as Felisberto Benedito
 Agatha Moreira as Ema Cavalcante
 Ricardo Tozzi as Xavier Vidal
 Tarcísio Meira as Lorde Williamson
 Gabriela Duarte as Julieta Bittencourt, Rainha do Café
 Maurício Destri as Camilo Bittencourt
 Joaquim Lopes as Olegário
 Malvino Salvador as Coronel Brandão
 Isabella Santoni as Charlotte Williamson
 Rodrigo Simas as Ernesto Pricelli
 Ary Fontoura as Afrânio Cavalcante, Barão de Ouro Verde
 Murilo Rosa as Jorge
 Marcelo Faria as Aurélio Cavalcante
 Grace Gianoukas as Petúnia
 Christine Fernandes as Josephine Tibúrcio
 Oscar Magrini as Almirante Tibúrcio
 Marcos Pitombo as Rômulo Tibúrcio
 Bruno Gissoni as Diogo Uirapuru
 Juliano Laham as Luccino Pricelli
 Rosane Gofman as Nicoletta Pricelli
 Silvio Guindane as Januário de Souza
Laila Zaid as Ludmila de Albuquerque
Tammy Di Calafiori as Fani Pricelli
 Miguel Rômulo as Randolfo
 Fábio Villa Verde as Lobato
 Priscila Marinho as Tenória Pereira
 JP Rufino as Trajano Pereira (Estilingue - en. Slingshot)
 Theo de Almeida Lopes as Tadeu
 Amauri Reis as François
 Emmilio Moreira as Vicente
 Giordano Becheleni as Virgilio Pricelli
 Jairo Mattos as Gaetano Pricelli
 Pedro Henrique Müller as Captain/Major Otávio
 Tony Correia as Manoel
 Vania de Brito as Agatha

Guest cast
 Letícia Persiles as Amélia
 Daniela Carvalho as Carolina
 Adriana Machado 
 Rosana Bittencourt as Princess of Café

Soundtrack 

Orgulho e Paixão (Trilha Sonora da Novela) is the soundtrack of the telenovela, released on 20 April 2018 by Som Livre.

Ratings

References

External links 
 

TV Globo telenovelas
Brazilian telenovelas
2018 Brazilian television series debuts
2018 Brazilian television series endings
Brazilian LGBT-related television shows
Television series set in the 1910s
Costume drama television series
2018 telenovelas
Television series based on Pride and Prejudice
Portuguese-language telenovelas